Seán Ó Súilleabháin (30 November 1903 – 13 December 1996) was a teacher and folklorist with the Irish Folklore Commission. He was a native Irish speaker from County Kerry.

Educated at St. Brendan's, College, Killarney, he trained from 1921 to 23 as a national school teacher De La Salle College Waterford. Working as a teacher in Kilkenny and Mount Sion, Waterford. He took an external BA in Celtic Studies from University College London in 1934, followed by an MA. In 1935 he became the first archivist with the Irish Folklore Commission which had been set up, and trained at the Uppsala University in Sweden. Following the closure of the commission, he worked as a lecturer in University College Dublin. He was awarded an honorary DLittCelt from the National University of Ireland in 1976.

Personal life
He married Mairin Sheehy, and had a son and daughter. He died on 13 December 1996, and is buried in Shanagangan Cemetery, County Dublin.

References

1903 births
1996 deaths
Irish folklorists
Irish schoolteachers
People from County Kerry
Alumni of University College London
Alumni of De La Salle Teacher Training College, Waterford